is a Japanese actor and model known for his starring role as Hiromu Sakurada/Red Buster in the 2012 Super Sentai Series Tokumei Sentai Go-Busters. Until August 24, 2020, he was affiliated with Ever Green Entertainment. He is also a Keio University, Faculty of Environment and Information Studies student.

Career
Suzuki started his debut on 2009 when he won Grand Prix in the 22nd Junon Super Boy contest. He also appeared in TBS All-Star Thanksgiving Akasaka 5-chome mini marathon where he placed 3rd on April 9, 2011.

In February 2012, he starred in the 36th Super Sentai series titled Tokumei Sentai Go-Busters as Hiromu Sakurada/Red Buster which made him the first actor born in the 1990s to play a Sentai Red Ranger.

Filmography

TV Dramas
Misaki Number One! as Hattori Katsuo (2011 )
ShimaShima as Hayashida Rindou (2011)
Hanazakari no Kimitachi e (2011 TV series) as Noe Shinji (2011)
Tokumei Sentai Go-Busters as Sakurada Hiromu/Red Buster (2012 - 2013 )
Limit as Hinata Haruaki (2013) 
Camouflage Family as Isawa Masahiko (2013)
Yowakutemo Katemasu (2014)
Kamen Rider Zi-O as Mondo Douan/Kamen Rider Quiz ( 2019)

Kihei  no kuni ( 2021)

Films
Kaizoku Sentai Gokaiger vs. Space Sheriff Gavan: The Movie as Red Buster (voice only) (2012)
Kamen Rider × Super Sentai: Super Hero Taisen as Sakurada Hiromu/Red Buster (2012)
Tokumei Sentai Go-Busters the Movie: Protect the Tokyo Enetower! Sakurada Hiromu/Red Buster (2012)
Ouran High School Host Club as Hayato Tarumi (2012)
Tokumei Sentai Go-Busters vs. Kaizoku Sentai Gokaiger: The Movie as Sakurada Hiromu/Red Buster (2013)
Kamen Rider × Super Sentai × Space Sheriff: Super Hero Taisen Z as Sakurada Hiromu/Red Buster, Kamen Rider Decade (voice) (2013)
Zyuden Sentai Kyoryuger vs. Go-Busters: The Great Dinosaur Battle! Farewell Our Eternal Friends as Hiromu Sakurada/Red Buster (2014)
Bow Then Kiss (2017)
Fly Me to the Saitama (2019)
Kiss Me at the Stroke of Midnight (2019)

Stage
Ever Green Entertainment Show 2010 (26 日 7 Jan 2010 - 29)
Osaero (August 26, 2010 – 30 days)
(19 to 24 October 2011 年) SAKURA
(2 to 7 November 2011 年) PRIDE
Ever Green Entertainment Show 2011 Vol.2 (23 月 11 日, 2011 - December 3)
Tumbling Vol.4 (4 days (Thursday) to August August 1, 2013 (Sunday), August 19, 2013 (Tue) - August 13 (month))
Owari no Seraph The Musical

Original DVD

Tokumei Sentai Go-Busters VS  Black Buster  Pink  (2012) as Hiromu Sakurada/Red Buster 
Returns! Tokumei Sentai Go-Busters VS Dobutsu Sentai Go-Busters as Hiromu Sakurada/Red Buster/Red Cheetah (2013)

Events
(March 25, 2010) JUNON BOY FESTIVAL 2010
MILK BOY Fashion Show (404 Not Fashion) (10 月 24, 2010)
Recovery from the Great East Japan Earthquake Charity Event "Charity non Colle" (May 21, 2011)
(August 30, 2011) School Festival 2011 Seventeen summer
(January 28–29, 2012) Super Sentai series and new program special premiere presentation
(March 31, 2012) non-no fashion event "Spring 2012 Colle"
(August 24, 2012) School Festival 2012 Seventeen summer

Participation work

CD
Pack mini album Koro-chan "Tokumei Sentai Go-Busters" (April 25, 2012)

Publication
 "False carp alliance." Pinky Shueisha Bunko cover model
 I land Bunko "The world is changing and all" magic cover model
 MILKBOY 2011 WINTER catalog model

References

External links
 http://www.suzukikatsuhiro.com

1992 births
Living people
Models from Kanagawa Prefecture
Male actors from Kanagawa Prefecture
21st-century Japanese male actors